Abhay is a Kannada-language romantic action masala film released in 2009 written by Janardhana Maharshi and directed Mahesh Babu. It was produced by Babu Reddy under Nithin Productions banner. Darshan and Aarti Thakur appeared in lead roles.

Cast
Darshan as Abhay
Aarti Thakur as Aarti
Pradeep Rawat as MLA Narasimha Murthy
Om Prakash Rao as Shastri
Salim Baig as Paandu, MLA Narasimha's brother
Mangalore Suresh

Soundtrack
All the songs are composed and scored by V. Harikrishna.

Reception 
R G Vijayasarathy of Rediff.com scored the film at 2 out of 5 stars and says "The only positive point about the film is Darshan's stunts, particularly in the climax. Darshan is lively as usual in his portrayal of Abhay. He excels in dances and fights and there is no scope for any emotion in the film. Ramesh Babu's camera work is good". A critic from The Times of India scored the film at 3 out of 5 stars and wrote "Darshan excels. Arathi Thakur is okay. Pradeep Rawat is excellent. Omprakash Rao gives a comical touch. Camerawork by Ramesh Babu is good. Ravivarma's brilliant action sequences deserve special mention". A critic from Bangalore Mirror wrote  "The film is a mix of stale plots and unrewarding scenes. You are supposed to laugh when the comic character is slapped and take notice when Darshan and baddies fly around tied to invisible safety cords. A film that will appeal only to Darshan fans but not in a way that they would want to pay and watch again". A critic from Sify.com wrote  "Darshan has struggled hard to make his presence but ultimately, a poorly etched out characetra nd script lets him down. There is no chemistry between the lovers and the three villain brothers hams. Omprakash comedy is some relief. V.Harikrishna gives two lovely tunes ? Neena Kane?and Yako nenna Jotheiddare?.. There are some exotic locations on screen from the camera of Ramesh Babu".

References

2009 films
2000s Kannada-language films
2009 action comedy films
Films scored by V. Harikrishna
2000s masala films
Indian action comedy films
Indian romantic action films
2000s romantic action films
Films directed by Mahesh Babu (director)